Baegunsan is a mountain in Jeollanam-do, South Korea. Its area extends across the city of Gwangyang.

See also
List of mountains in Korea

Mountains of South Jeolla Province
Gwangyang
Mountains of South Korea
One-thousanders of South Korea
Sobaek Mountains